Bonkers is an  American animated television series and a spinoff as segment series called He's Bonkers of Disney's Raw Toonage. It aired from February 28, 1993, to February 23, 1994, in first-run syndication (after a "preview airing" on The Disney Channel in early 1993). The syndicated run was available both separately and as part of the programming block The Disney Afternoon. Reruns of the show continued in syndication until 1996 and were later shown on Toon Disney until late 2004. The show is currently available for streaming on Disney+, having been included upon its November 2019 launch. However, this only applies to US territories. It is also currently available in Europe.

Premise
The premise of the series was that Bonkers D. Bobcat, an anthropomorphic bobcat who was a popular cartoon star, had washed out of show business and became a cop. He was made the junior partner of Detective Lucky Piquel, a grim and ill-tempered human who hates toons. Throughout the series, the pair work together to solve crimes in the Hollywood, Los Angeles, California, region. Bonkers repeatedly tried to win Piquel's praise, but usually just ended up ruining missions with his antics. But often those goofy antics would prove to save the day.

After multiple episodes of working with Bonkers, Piquel was given an FBI job in Washington, D.C., and with great glee was finally able to leave Bonkers, but finally realized that after all the time spent hating working with Bonkers he had grown to love him. He took along the police radio, the light, Toots and Fall-Apart Rabbit. At the end of the "Lucky" episodes, Bonkers was given a new partner, the attractive cool-headed Officer Miranda Wright. Although also human, she was far more patient and tolerant of his antics than was Piquel. With Miranda, Bonkers was more the brunt of the slapstick.

Episodes

Characters

Bonkers D. Bobcat

Bonkers D. Bobcat (voiced by Jim Cummings) is an overly energetic and hyperactive cartoon anthropomorphic bobcat that works in the Toon Division of the Hollywood PD. Once a big name cartoon star for Wackytoons Studios, he was fired due to his show being bumped out of first place in the ratings. He was introduced to law enforcement when he unknowingly saved cartoon celebrity Donald Duck from a park mugger (mostly due to the help of officer Lucky Piquel) and was given full credit for the mugger's capture.

For his actions, he received the Citizen of Valor award by the Chief of Police, Leonard Kanifky. Bonkers, while soaking in the praise, told the chief about how his experiences starring in police cartoons helped in the capture of the mugger. Chief Kanifky mistook his fictional roles as real life, worldwide police accounts and, thinking that Bonkers would be a benefit to the police force, asked if the former cartoon star would like a job working for the Hollywood PD, which Bonkers accepted because of his recent unemployment from Wackytoons Studios. Bonkers then requested Lucky as his partner, and the two established the beginning of the Toon Division. When Bonkers first came home to Lucky's house, he was treated as a sort of adopted son to Lucky.

Although Bonkers means well, he usually messes up cases for his fellow officers due to his lack of experience in law enforcement and his wild, exaggerated, cartoony nature. He even tells Lucky at one point that he is not good at logical police thinking because he is a toon. Not only does Bonkers make a design change between the 'Lucky' and 'Miranda' episodes, his personality is slightly tweaked as well. Despite being a police officer, Bonkers is unarmed. However, he still carries a badge.

In the 'Miranda' episodes, he's portrayed as a rather clumsy, somewhat foolish character who ends up being the show's punching bag. In the Lucky episodes, he's less of a buffoon and more of an Inspector Clouseau-type, in control of himself (though still hyperactive), and carries an extensive knowledge about the toon and their behavior, which is an asset on cases dealing with rogue toons (Lucky would very rarely acknowledge this, although he knows it deep inside). The joke is his lack of law enforcement experience and procedure is still his "Achilles' heel".

Supporting characters
Fall Apart Rabbit (voiced by Frank Welker) is Bonkers' clumsy best friend and stunt-double back during Bonkers' Hollywood days, appearing only in the "Lucky Episodes." He literally falls apart at the drop of a hat and must wear bandages over various body parts to keep himself from dismantling. He is often remarkably stupid and goofy, even for a cartoon character.
Fawn Deer (voiced by Nancy Cartwright) is Bonkers's main love interest and co-star when he was a cartoon star. Bonkers is willing to do just about anything to please and impress her. Fortunately for Bonkers, Fawn clearly reciprocates his obvious love for her, as she has proven it on numerous occasions by kissing him on the cheek, and sometimes on the lips. She appears mainly in the "Miranda Episodes".

Piquel family
Detective Lucky Shirley Piquel (voiced by Jim Cummings) is a police detective and Bonkers' partner from the "Lucky Episodes". He is a slovenly, morbidly obese, street-wise mustachioed man. He is balding, but wears a toupée. Lucky is a serious, hard-boiled detective whose by-the-book nature is at odds with Bonkers' decidedly more maniacal approach to crime solving. Chief Kanifky usually mistakes his last name for Pickle. In the first several episodes in which he appeared, he defeated the villain by falling on them or otherwise crushing them beneath his massive girth. Although he often was able to get to the core of the cartoon universe by finally embracing it, with Bonkers' help. Will prove increasingly good and less comfortable against an annoying toon, in each case of the cartoons. He is the father of Marilyn and husband to Dilandra or who he normally calls "Dil" or "Dyl". It was revealed in Once in a Blue Toon that his middle name is Shirley, and that he has a 53-inch waistline. He drives a rather torn-down patrol car through the series.
Marilyn Piquel (voiced by Sherry Lynn) is Lucky's child genius daughter. She is an aspiring artist as well as a script/story writer and has deep connection to toons such as Bonkers, with her favorite toon being TV star Skunky Skunk. She is more than capable of taking care of herself and aids her father in a number of his cases often being the words of wisdom or a source of knowledge to Lucky. Although looking like her mom Dilandra "Dil"/"Dyl" (aside from her big round glasses and freckled face), she also shares her father's hair color.
Dilandra "Dyl" Piquel (voiced by April Winchell) is Lucky's understanding wife who supports her husband and at times encourages their daughter Marilyn.

Wright family
Officer Miranda Wright (voiced by Karla DeVito) is a police officer that works at the same police station as Lucky. She is Bonkers' partner from the "Miranda Episodes". Her name is a play on Miranda rights, an American system in which people under arrest get certain rights, she's the opposite of Lucky and Sgt. Grating when it comes to toons and their antics as she likes/loves them especially her friend and partner Bonkers as she cool headedly tolerates his antics and stands up for him against their own boss, While she may have somewhat of a personal limit to Bonkers' sporadic behavior at times, it doesn't really seem to annoy her, She even seems amused at times, but nonetheless they still truly care and stand up for each other as friends and partners. 
Shirley Wright (voiced by Erin Gray) is a news reporter, Miranda's older sister, and apparently Timmy's mother.
Timmy Wright (voiced by Dana Hill) is the troublesome nephew of Miranda Wright, who Bonkers babysits.

Los Angeles Police Department officers 
Leonard Kanifky (voiced by Earl Boen) is the absent-minded chief of police, and is the boss of Bonkers and Lucky (before Bonkers is reassigned) he also appears in the Miranda episodes "Dog Day AfterToon", "Cartoon Cornered" and "When the Spirit Moves You". He has the tendency to ramble on and trail off, as if senile. He constantly mispronounces Lucky's last name "Pickle".
Sergeant Francis Q. Grating (voiced by Ron Perlman) is a police sergeant and, the boss of Bonkers and Miranda. A running gag is that Grating is almost driven insane by Bonkers. Like Lucky, he hates toons too. However, in "Cartoon Cornered", he befriended Bonkers' clock after their adventures in Wacky Toons Studio. In "Dog Day AfterToon" he shows some respect to Bonkers after he is saved from the bank hold-up; albeit reluctantly.

Recurring civilian characters
The Mad Hatter and March Hare – From Disney's Alice in Wonderland, the Mad Hatter (voiced by Corey Burton) and March Hare (voiced by Jesse Corti) make three appearances in the show. They live in the Hollywood Sign; the "H" is the Door.
Toots (voiced by Frank Welker) – Bonkers's pet horn, appearing only in the "Lucky Episodes". Last appearance was in "New Partners on the Block".
Police Light (voiced by Charlie Adler) – The toon police light. Appearing only in the "Lucky Episodes". Last appearance was in "New Partners on the Block".
Broderick (voiced by Jim Cummings) – The toon radio. Appearing only in the "Lucky Episodes". Last appearance was in "New Partners on the Block".
Jitters A. Dog (voiced by Jeff Bennett) – a small, nervous dog who was Bonkers's friend and sidekick in Raw Toonage; and the episodes with Miranda. His role in the series was of the straight man, constantly having serious bodily harm done to him through Bonkers' recklessness (and occasionally others) his catchphrase is; "I hate my life". Despite his mostly negative luck, He is still Bonkers's best friend, though Jitters himself might disagree. He did have a quick cameo in "Going Bonkers".
Grumbles Grizzly (voiced by Rodger Bumpass) – a grizzly bear who was Bonkers's strict boss in Raw Toonage, appears occasionally in Bonkers.
Harry the Handbag (voiced by Frank Welker) – a deeply troubled toon who captured and stored objects and people inside of himself in a misguided belief that it would end his loneliness.
Tiny (voiced by Charlie Adler) – a huge but polite hamster stayed at Lucky's house to hide from a scary shadow, which turns out to be his old friend, Mr. Big.
Pops Clock (voiced by Stuart Pankin) – a The toon keeper of toon-time, which is what keeps toons under-control, but was mad when nobody appreciated him for all the work he did.
Skunky Skunk (voiced by Rip Taylor) – A favorite toon TV star of Marilyn Piquel who was framed for manslaughter by an embittered Celebrity chef, who then tried to arrange a "fatal accident" for him.
Professor Ludwig Von Drake (voiced by Corey Burton) – a scientist duck who occasionally appears as a scientific expert or creator of inventions that Bonkers uses in his cases.
Roderick Lizzard (voiced by Jeff Bennett) – a yellow iguana and a temperamental actor with the manners of a British aristocrat. He also prefers to have his surname pronounced lee-ZARD rather than LIH-zurd.
Tuttle Turtle (voiced by Maurice LaMarche) – a toon turtle that is the valet of Roderick Lizzard.
Bucky Buzzsaw (voiced by Pat Fraley) – a toon beaver who stars in his own show at Wackytoon Studios. He appears in the Miranda Episodes. His catchphrase is "whoopidy woo woo"
Slap, Sniffle and Flop – Toon mascots of the Weetie Crunchy cereal. Loosely based on Snap, Crackle and Pop from Rice Krispies.
Brer Bear – From Song of the South. He made his cameo appearance in "Casabonkers".
Donald Duck (voiced by Tony Anselmo) – a famous Disney duck that Bonkers saved from being robbed in "Going Bonkers".
Mickey Mouse (voiced by Wayne Allwine) 
Goofy (voiced by Bill Farmer) – he made his cameo appearance from Goof Troop, together with Pete, Max and PJ.
Horace Horsecollar
Clarabelle Cow
Darkwing Duck (voiced by Jim Cummings) – occasionally appears in the Miranda episodes.
Marsupilami
Lady and the Tramp – They made their cameo appearance in various episodes of the show, specifically the Miranda episodes, including "Casabonkers".
Mrs. Francine Kanifky (voiced by Tress MacNeille) – the wife of Kanifky typically appears for a very short portion of the episodes in which she appears.  In "The Dimming" and "Poltertoon". She is more integral to the overall story.

Recurring antagonists
The Collector (voiced by Michael Bell) - the villain from the pilot episode ("Going Bonkers") and therefore the first criminal Bonkers encounters. He is a toon that collects other toons in suspended animation. At the end of the episode, he is revealed to simply be a deranged, cartoon obsessed human nerd in disguise.
Mr. Doodles (voiced by Jeff Bennett) - the Collector's evil henchman.
Ma Parker (voiced by June Foray) - a toon tow truck who has tricked Lucky into thinking she's really sweet, but is found out by Bonkers is that she is really a criminal who is stealing parts of their police car to build a suit of armor for a monster truck rally. With her armor she is nearly invulnerable from the outside but Bonkers tricks her into opening her hood. Despite her efforts Ma is helpless as Bonkers tinkers with her engine until she is unable to move. He then proceeds to arrest the immobilized toon truck.
Wooly and Bully (voiced by Rob Paulsen and Pat Fraley) - Ma Tow Truck's evil yet dim-witted henchmen.
The Rat (voiced by Brad Garrett) - a toon rat who was really a wannabe human star in disguise to replace Mickey Mouse.
The Ape (voiced by Chuck McCann) - Mr. Malone's large toon pink gorilla accomplice.
Chick and Stu  (voiced by Chick Vennera and Tino Insana)
Mammoth Mammoth – (voiced by Stuart Pankin) -
Toon Bomb – (voiced by Jess Harnell) -
Mr. Big (voiced by S. Scott Bullock) - a toon mouse who, despite the name, is very small. He is a friend to Tiny, who is a huge but polite hamster. He used a giant shadow to scare him.
The Weather Toons – Five toons, including Sunny (the sun), Cloudy (a raincloud), Snowy (a drift of snow), Sparky (a lightning bolt), and Toony Tornado (a tornado).
Louse A. Nominous (voiced by Brad Garrett) - an unreformable toon criminal that Bonkers and Lucky were forced to reform. He eats anything in his path (usually furniture). He wrote a book about reforming toons. A running gag that occurs is when he eats something inedible, he laughs and says "Ain't I a louse?".
Mikey Muffin (voiced by S. Scott Bullock) - the toon mascot of Butterman's Bakery, but is found out that he was blowing up the bakeries with "doughbombs" to try to get Butterman's secret recipe, he only appeared in the Lucky Piquel era episode "Hand Over The Dough".
Wacky Weasel (voiced by Rip Taylor) - the cunningest (and most feared as even the laid back Chief Leonard Kanifky was afraid of him) toon villain that ever existed who had a fixation for eggs of any kind, which originally led to his capture (he broke into a prison because he heard it was full of "bad eggs") upon breaking out of jail, he went on a rampage through the city, running rings round the entire police force, before finally being outsmarted by Bonkers, he only appeared in the Lucky Piquel era episode "Get Wacky".
Scatter Squirrel (voiced by Tino Insana) - a crazed thief with a fixation for nuts of any kind, Lucky and Bonkers had to aid former Chief Leonard Kanifky in capturing him, in order for the mayor to give Kanifky's job back.
Toon Pencil (voiced by S. Scott Bullock) - a toon graffiti artist who spread toon graffiti all over Hollywood, Marilyn had a major role in helping her father and Bonkers track him down by chasing the pencil into a surreal toon world where he (the pencil) normally would hide out.
Zoom and Boom (voiced by Jimmy Hibbert) -
Warris and Donald– two toon ex-comedians that are fading in color and kidnap other toons to steal their colors. They only appear in the Lucky Piquel era episode, "Color Me Piquel".
Turbo, Banshee and Kapow - trolls who replaced Slap, Sniffle and Flop in their cereal commercial and tried to frame them for stealing prizes in the cereal boxes.
TJ Finger (voiced by Dan Ferro) - a toon actor who kidnapped TV critic Charles Quibble, because Quibble's bad reviews caused TJ's show Cop Squad to get cancelled, He only appeared in the Lucky Piquel era episode "The Final Review."
Two-Bits (voiced by Gilbert Gottfried) - an executive for Grandpa Arnie's Ant Show, who uses a vacuum to steal the audience's change so that he can reunite with “Nicky”, a nickel he had lost when his father put it in a parking meter. Two-Bits stops stealing change after Lucky gives him his last nickel, which turns out be Nicky.
Fireball Frank (voiced by Brad Garrett) -
Al Vermin (voiced by Maurice LaMarche) - the toon cockroach who is Miranda and Bonkers's nemesis from the Miranda Wright era episodes.
Lilith DuPrave (voiced by Eileen Brennan) - Lilith DuPrave is a sleazy business woman and one of Bonkers and Miranda's nemesis who is the owner of a printing office where she not only publishes "Hollywood Chronicle" (and later "The National Trash") but prints counterfeit money as well. She is also responsible for smuggling weapons and kidnapping toons.
Mr. Blackenblue (voiced by Maurice LaMarche) - a heavily armed, powerfully-built man that never removes his glasses. He is the bodyguard of Lilith DuPrave and doubles as a hitman.
WildMan Wyatt (voiced by Pat Fraley) - Sergeant Grating's sworn enemy.
Katya Legs Go-won-a-lot (voiced by Sherry Lynn) - a toon cat who is an actress, a singer, and a thief, she appeared in the Miranda Wright era episode "CasaBonkers." 
Flaps the Elephant (voiced by Joe Alaskey) - a massive toon elephant with small ears. He wishes he could fly like Dumbo
Seymour Sleazebottom and Limo Seymour  (voiced by Corey Burton) - a crooked real estate agent, and his pink toon limo (Voiced by Charlie Adler). They Only appear in the Lucky Piquel era episode, "Fallapart Land".  
 Winston Prickley (voiced by Rene Auberjononis)  - a crooked lovesick porcupine who kidnaps other men just to try win the love of women, but never wins a woman's heart especially due to kidnapping crimes, he  appeared in the Miranda Wright era episode "Love Stuck." 
Gloomy the Clown - a crooked nemesis  of  Bonkers  and Miranda who is a circus clown wanting to be funniest man alive but is really lame and can't stand toons stealing and overshadowing his spotlight and attention (voiced by Ken Mars)- he only appeared in The Miranda Wright era episode "The Toon that Ate Hollywood".

Production
The series played 65 episodes, as part of The Disney Afternoon. They were not created in chronological order: The "Miranda" episodes were actually produced first, excluding the two-part series premiere, which featured Piquel and Bonkers meeting for the first time. This discrepancy becomes evident when observing the look of the main character in both sets of episodes. In the Raw Toonage shorts, Bonkers was orange with one brown spot, golf-club-like ears, and an undone tail. When the Lucky Piquel-era episodes (produced by Robert Taylor) were made, the character had a major overhaul: skinnier ears, two black spots on each his tufts, black Tigger-like stripes on his tail, and a different uniform. The Miranda Wright-era episodes (produced by Duane Capizzi, Robert Hathcock & Greg Weisman) use Bonkers's original look from Raw Toonage. The series also occasionally featured episodes of "cartoons" from Bonkers's pre-police actor days, all lifted from the Raw Toonage series.  The two-part premiere can be seen to show the reason for the difference in appearance as he mostly appears with his Black Dot Lucky design, but when he goes into makeup, his sweater is put on, and when his head re-appears, his spots have turned brown, then his ears are 'puffed' up. While this works for explaining the two designs in context, New partners does not show or explain why he then decided to use his 'make up' version for every day.

The Raw Toonage shorts were an after-thought of production. While Bonkers was in pre-production, the Raw Toonage team headed by Larry Latham produced 12 "He's Bonkers" shorts. These shorts were, in the context of Bonkers, explained to be some of the shorts Bonkers made at Wackytoons Studios before he was fired. The animated short entitled Petal to the Metal was originally shown in theaters in 1992 before the feature movie 3 Ninjas, while the rest were shown on the program Raw Toonage. In syndication, the shorts were collected into four full episodes with fillers of new material in between.

Meanwhile, Duane Capizzi, making his producing debut, was brought into the fold and teamed with animation veteran Robert Hathcock and charged with making 65 episodes (a full season's worth in syndication). The episodes theoretically would feature Bonkers with Wright as his partner. These episodes came back from overseas animation studios looking less than spectacular, causing considerable concern at Disney. Ultimately, the original team was replaced, and a team headed by Robert Taylor came in. Only 19 of the original-order shows survived to air; they are what is known as the "Miranda Wright episodes" of Bonkers. Nine of these episodes were aired on The Disney Channel during the first half of 1993 as a preview for the series, before its syndicated premiere in the fall. The 19 Miranda Wright episodes are shown toward the end of the series in the official continuity. Greg Weisman (co-creator of Disney's Gargoyles) worked on the Miranda episodes, and Bonkers's relationship with Miranda inspired Goliath's relationship with Elisa Maza.

Taylor threw out the old premise of the show. He replaced it with the Lucky Piquel scenario, but his episodes were revised and established to occur before the original episodes. 42 episodes of the "Piquel Era" were made, including one (New Partners on the Block), which attempted to bridge the gap between the two somewhat contradictory storylines.

The series was long incorrectly rumored to have originally been intended as a Roger Rabbit spin-off series which ended up being scrapped due to licensing issues from Amblin Entertainment, with Bonkers being created instead. However, in 2008, Greg Weisman, who was a writer on the series, denied this. While confirming that the title character was inspired by Roger, and the Toontown concept had also been influenced by the film, Weisman insists that Bonkers was always meant to be his own character.

The syndicated version of the series (which omits several of the original episodes that survived first-run) was last seen on Toon Disney until late 2004.

The series became available to stream on Disney+, upon its launch on November 12, 2019.

New Partners on the Block
New Partners on the Block was a transition episode that showed how Bonkers went from having Lucky Piquel as a partner to having Miranda Wright as his newest partner. The episode was much like the pilot episode/movie "Going Bonkers", using the CGI rain and bringing back the characters that were associated with Bonkers, those characters being Fawn Deer, Jitters A. Dog, and Grumbles Grizzly and, unlike the pilot, had more speaking and screen time.

At the end of the episode, Bonkers, along with Miranda and Lucky, captured the main villain, bomber Fireball Frank and Rescues FBI Agent Tolson in the process, making Bonkers and Miranda a team and giving Lucky a job as an FBI Agent in Washington, D.C. Piquel, his family Dyl (wife) and Marilyn (daughter), Fall-Apart Rabbit, Toots and Brodrick the toon radio all subsequently relocated to Washington, D.C., allowing them to be written out of the show.

This episode was removed from rotation in the United States after the 1995 Oklahoma City bombing due to its bombing/terrorism plot, and was consequently never rerun on Toon Disney, even before Disney's stricter censorship policies following the September 11 attacks. Another episode, "Fall Apart Bomb Squad," was also not shown on Toon Disney for similar reasons. However, both episodes have been rerun in Europe (especially in Italy). In addition, both episodes are available to stream on Disney+.

Home media
Bonkers was released on three VHS tapes and Betamax tapes in 1995 by Walt Disney Home Video, each containing no more than two episodes. They include the following:

Video on demand
The entire series available to stream on Disney+ since its launch on November 12, 2019, both in USA and in Europe.

Other appearances and references
Aladdin (1994–1995): In the episode "Snowman is an Island", the Genie was transformed into Bonkers.
Animaniacs jabbed at Bonkers (which was often its timeslot rival in a number of markets as a part of Fox Kids), especially in the Slappy Squirrel segments, referring to it as being unfunny. This continued in the 2020 revival as it was parodied in the first episode as Clunkers, a talking police car who is also a time machine.
Goosebumps referenced the show in "Piano Lessons Can Be Murder", the 13th book of the original series.
DuckTales (2017): Bonkers makes a non-speaking cameo appearance in the episode "Let's Get Dangerous!"
Chip 'n Dale: Rescue Rangers (2022): Bonkers makes two non-speaking cameo appearances. The first is during the film's finale alongside other bootlegged cartoon characters having been bootlegged into a walrus. The second is during the end credits on a billboard for "Disney Afternoon Fist Fight" alongside other DA toons, and he's back to his old self.
The Simpsons: There is a possible reference to bonkers in the 9th episode of season 12 "HOMR" at 3:06, in which a cardboard cutout of an orange cat alongside other cartoons in a police uniform appears briefly

Video games
The series inspired three video games. The first, titled Bonkers, is a platform game by Capcom, released for the Super NES in October 1994. In the game, Bonkers must retrieve three items stolen from a museum.

An action game by Sega, also titled Bonkers, was released in 1994 for the Sega Mega Drive/Genesis. It consists of four mini-games in which Bonkers attempts to apprehend criminals from the series.

The third game, Disney's Bonkers: Wax Up!, was published for the Game Gear in 1995, followed three years later by a Brazilian-only release on the Master System. In the game, Bonkers sets out to rescue Lucky and several toons who have been captured.

References

External links

Bonkers at Don Markstein's Toonopedia. Archived from the original on February 22, 2018.
Pedal to the Metal at The Encyclopedia of Disney Animated Shorts
Bonkers on RetroJunk.com

 
1990s American animated television series
1993 American television series debuts
1994 American television series endings
American animated television spin-offs
American children's animated adventure television series
American children's animated comedy television series
American children's animated fantasy television series
American children's animated mystery television series
1990s American police comedy television series
Animated television series about cats
Crossover animated television series
The Disney Afternoon
Disney Channel original programming
English-language television shows
Fictional portrayals of the Los Angeles Police Department
First-run syndicated television programs in the United States
Television series by Disney Television Animation
Television shows set in Los Angeles